Randy's Donuts is a bakery and a landmark building in Inglewood, California which is near Los Angeles International Airport. It is built in a style that dates to a period in the early 20th century that saw a proliferation of programmatic architecture throughout Southern California. This style had its heyday from the mid-1920s to the mid-1930s. By the 1950s however, the trend of designing structures in the shape of the product sold there had changed to focus on signs rather than architecture itself. Randy's is represented by a giant doughnut on the roof of an otherwise ordinary drive-in that is a dedicated doughnut bakery. The building was designed by Henry J. Goodwin.

Colossal donut signs atop Randy's stores vary in size. Most locations use a  diameter version that sits atop the building and faces an intersection. In Roadside Giant by Brian and Sarah Butko, the Weintraubs climbed on top of the doughnut with a tape measure and confirmed the measurements for the authors. The Bellflower and Reseda locations, however, feature a smaller version of the doughnut on top of a pole in front of the building. This may be  in diameter, as is widely reported.

The 24-hour drive-in is at 805 West Manchester Boulevard and it intersects with La Cienega Boulevard. It is near the Manchester Boulevard off-ramp of the San Diego Freeway (I-405).

History 
In the late 1940s, doughnut machine salesman Russell Wendell founded a chain of drive-in doughnut shops named Big Donut. The first location opened in 1951 in Westmont. The second location which is now a Randy's Donuts, was opened in 1952. Designed by architect Henry Goodwin and structural engineer Richard Bradshaw, the rooftop doughnut is constructed out of rolled steel bars covered with gunite.

In 1976, after shifting focus to his Pup 'N' Taco chain (bought by Taco Bell in 1984), Wendell sold the Big Donut Inglewood location to Robert Eskow who renamed the location "Randy's Donuts" after his son. In 1978, Eskow sold the shop to Ron and Larry Weintraub, who decided to retain the name for the business.

In 2015, Randy's Donuts was purchased by lawyer and entrepreneur Mark Kelegian. Since that time the brand has added franchise locations in Southern California, South Korea, Saudi Arabia, and Las Vegas.

In popular culture
The building was featured in the films Earth Girls Are Easy, Entourage, The Golden Child, [[Into the Night (1985 film)|Into the Night]], Stripped to Kill, Problem Child 2, Breathless, The Kissing Booth 3, California Girls, 2012, Iron Man 2, Get Shorty, Volcano, Crocodile Dundee in Los Angeles, Escape from Petropolis, Blood In Blood Out, Dope, and Love Letters. It can be seen briefly with other world-famous monuments in the Futurama episode "When Aliens Attack".

It was also featured in the music videos for Becky G's "Becky from the Block", Randy Newman's "I Love LA" and The Prodigy's "Wind It Up", as well as the music video for Red Hot Chili Peppers' "Californication".

Similar buildings with giant donuts, under different names, are featured in the video games Midnight Club: Los Angeles, Need for Speed: Most Wanted, City of Heroes, and Grand Theft Auto: San Andreas as well as in  "Marge vs. the Monorail", an episode of The Simpsons, and in the film Mars Attacks!. Garth can be seen slurping jelly from a Randy's Donut in Wayne's World. In Steven Universe, a building known as the "Big Donut" was shown in the show.

The iconic structure was shown on the History Channel series Life After People, showing what would happen to the building without human repair.

The building was shown in the Masked Rider Episode "Ferbus Maximus" where an overgrown Ferbus takes the giant doughnut and tries to eat it, only to reject it for being fake.

The building's famous doughnut can be spotted in the scene changes of the Nickelodeon sitcom Victorious.

In the episode "Pier Pressure" of Arrested Development, in a sequence showing Buster's medical trial for THC, medical marijuana, a picture is shown of Buster standing next to Randy's Donuts on the roof attempting to eat his way through it.

The doughnut sign appears in the animated short film Logorama.

The store was mentioned in The Big Bang Theory as Howard (Simon Helberg) tells of a prank pulled on Sheldon (Jim Parsons) while pretending to be Dr. Stephen Hawking to meet at the Randy's Donut at 2 in the morning.

The building was used in Ken Block's "Gymkhana 7" video.

On 4 July 2017, Inglewood rapcore band Fever 333 had their first public performance in a U-Haul truck in the shop's parking lot.

In the pilot episode of The Bernie Mac Show, in Californication, and in Runaways''.

See also
 List of doughnut shops
 The Donut Hole

References

External links

  with additional photos
 Map of (Former) Big Do-Nut Drive-Ins that are still standing
 Photo of the original chain founder and owner Russ Wendell
 Newspaper Photo of a Big Do-nut Drive-In from the 1950s

Bakeries of California
Buildings and structures in Inglewood, California
Doughnut shops in the United States
Individual signs in the United States
Landmarks in Los Angeles County, California
Novelty buildings in California
Restaurants established in 1953
Restaurants in Greater Los Angeles
Tourist attractions in Inglewood, California
1953 establishments in California